"Into Your Arms" is a single by the CEDM group Capital Kings from their album II. It was released on iTunes on July 17, 2015. The remix by Eli Ramzy was released on October 2, 2015, in the II album.

Track listing 
 Digital download
 "Into Your Arms" – 3:48

Remixes

1. "Into Your Arms (Eli Ramzy Remix)"—3:32

Release History

Charts and certifications

References 

2016 songs
2016 singles
Capital Kings songs
Gotee Records singles